Haemomaster venezuelae is a species of catfish (order Siluriformes) of the family Trichomycteridae, and the only species of the genus Haemomaster. This fish grows to about 6.6 centimetres (2.6 in) SL and originates from the Amazon and Orinoco River basins.

References

Trichomycteridae
Taxa named by George S. Myers
Fish of South America
Fish of the Amazon basin
Fish described in 1927